WhereverTV is an Over the Top (OTT) internet television platform provider located in Fort Myers, Florida. The company delivers linear television programming to SmartTVs, digital media receivers, and tablets via the public Internet.

The company has been providing access to free live-streaming TV channels over the internet since 2007 through its Global Interactive Program Guide (officially trademarked as Global IPG) internet TV software, allowing registered users to watch TV online. In 2011, the company began selling subscription services for live television from Morocco and Greece. In 2013, it began selling Arabic TV subscriptions. WhereverTV announced plans to launch two additional services for 2013: a software application aimed at managing US and international channels on portable and stationary internet-connected devices, and a traditional US-based subscription service.

WhereverTV is an alternative to fixed location subscription services such as those offered by cable companies and satellite television providers. Subscribers can personalize their viewing choices, and subscription services and watch from any location with Internet access. The company provides both wireless television and hard-wired access to TV over the internet.

History
The concept for what was to become WhereverTV was created by Mark Cavicchia while he was living in Shanghai, China, after becoming frustrated with the complexities of trying to stream the 2005 NCAA Men's Division I Basketball Championship tournament live on AOL by connecting his laptop to a big-screen television. He decided to create a portable channel guide that would work across devices and geographies and allow users to organize and watch TV online anywhere in the world. Upon returning to the United States in 2006, he wrote the patent application for WhereverTV's core technology.

To promote its Global Interactive Programme Guide concept, the Company wrote its own firmware to run on the popular open-source Neuros OSD hardware that was white-labeled and renamed The WhereverTV Receiver.  The first public demonstration of the WhereverTV receiver was made on July 9, 2008, at the Consumer Electronics Association's 2008 SINOCES trade show in Qingdao, China. Subsequently, the WhereverTV Receiver debuted at the 2009 International CES trade show in Las Vegas, Nevada, where it was covered by media outlets around the world, including the US, Poland, Israel, Brazil, and the Middle East.

Recognition
WhereverTV was named to 2010 Always-on's On-Media 100, the Top 100 Private Companies that are pioneering the next generation advertising and marketing Internet services. The WhereverTV Receiver was named one of the 30 Most Innovative Products at the 2009 Consumer Electronics Show. WhereverTV's CEO was also invited to testify at a Federal Communications Commission hearing on Broadband and the Digital Future.

See also
TV Everywhere
Web television
Over-the-top content
Multi-screen video
IPTV

References

External links
 

Companies traded over-the-counter in the United States
Digital television
Film and video technology
Internet broadcasting
Streaming television
Internet television channels
Streaming media systems